Karin de Lange (born 15 January 1964) is a Dutch sprinter. She competed in the women's 200 metres at the 1992 Summer Olympics.

References

1964 births
Living people
Athletes (track and field) at the 1992 Summer Olympics
Dutch female sprinters
Olympic athletes of the Netherlands
Sportspeople from Arnhem
Olympic female sprinters